Manasara (English : Whole-heartedly) is a 2010 Indian Telugu language romance film set against the backdrop of  Kalaripayattu, a martial art form that has origins in Kerala. The film is produced by Prakash Babu Kadiyala on directed by Ravi Babu and stars debutants Vikram and Sri Divya.

Plot 

Rajapalayam in Kerala is a village where time has stood still. A maternal, ritualistic society where honour held its head and sword high. The village folk lived and breathed Kalaripayittu that was their God, life and justice and were totally cut off from the modern world. Vikram's (Vikram) family had to move to this village when his father's job gets transferred there.

Anjali (Sri Divya) is a village belle who teaches blind kids. Vikram falls in love with her but conscious of his average looks is not sure the pretty Anjali would accept him. His local benefactor Krishnan Kutty (Bhanu Chander) tells him that the secret to gain a woman's love was not good looks but to have a good heart. Show her your heart, not your face, Kutty advises Vikram. Vikram follows the advice and masks himself and starts helping Anjali in difficult moments. The goodness of Vikram melts Anjali's heart and she falls in love with him.
But trouble was brewing in Anjali's home as her wicked step-mother tries to get Anjali closer to Rajan. Rajan was the national Kalaripayittu champ and the devil incarnate when it came to women. He was also the brother of Anjali's step-mother. Anjali's relationship with Vikram is discovered by Rajan and Anjali is locked up in her home. Rajan thrashes Vikram in front of Anjali and makes him lick his sandals in front of Anjali to show her Vikram's cowardice. Vikram's family is told to pack and leave town immediately.

Krishnan Kutty intervenes and calls for a meeting of the village elders. He tells them that Vikram's only mistake was that he had fallen in love and that Anjali was in love with him too. He tells them that since their society was maternal the girl's wishes had to be respected.  But the village elders ordain that Vikram was not a local and had to forget the girl and leave. But on further persuasion by Krishan Kutty, they reconsider their decision and deliver their verdict. Since the girl had two suitors, only a bout of Kalaripayittu would determine who her husband would be. The winner would get her hand. The gauntlet is thrown and a boy with no knowledge of Kalaripayittu is pitted against the champ. Krishnan Kutty decides to train Vikram and Anjali's father trains Rajan. Both Anjali's father and Krishnan Kutty were disciples of one master and had a score to settle themselves. The bloody ten-round Kalaripayittu climax decides the fate of Anjali and Vikram.

Cast 

 Vikram Veer as Vikram
 Sri Divya as Anjali
 Bhanu Chander as Krishnam Kutti
 Ronson Vincent as Rajan Pillai
 Ramaraju as Anjali’s father
 Ravi Prakash as young Kutti
 Annapoorna as Papayamma
 Bangalore Padma as Anjali’s step-mother
 Krishna Mohan as Vikram's father
 Usha Sri as Vikram’s mother's
 M. S. Narayana as Vikram’s grandfather (Cameo)

Music 

Music for this movie was composed by Shekar Chandra.

Reception 
Jeevi of Idlebrain.com wrote that "On the flip side, a better second half and an inspiring climax would have changed the commercial aspect of the movie". A critic from NDTV wrote that "the film has nothing big to offer".

References

External links

Films directed by Ravi Babu
2010s Telugu-language films